Kattupalli, is a suburb located North of Chennai, a metropolitan city in Tamil Nadu, India.

Location
Kattupalli is located in between Ennore, Pazhaverkadu and Minjur in North of Chennai. The arterial road in Kattupalli is Port access road (Ennore - Pazhaverkadu road).

Seawater Desalination Plant

The Minjur seawater desalination plant in Kattupalli plays a major role of water supply in North Chennai.

Kattupalli Port

The Kattupalli Port cum Shipyard is a private complex which has a port and a ship building unit. It is third largest port in Chennai after Chennai Port and Ennore Port. There were strong opposition from people for proposal of expanding the port.

References

External links
CMDA Official Webpage

Neighbourhoods in Chennai